The B.A. and Ruth Stover House is a historic 1924 residence in Bend, Oregon, United States. It was listed on the National Register of Historic Places in 1992.

Located at 1 NW Rocklyn Road, the two-story, gabled English Cottage style house was built on a former Indian campground at the northern littoral of Mirror Pond. The pond was created in 1909 when the Deschutes River was dammed for hydroelectric power.  The house was designed by Hugh Thompson and the contractor was Henry Nelson (1890–1984). Thompson was a friend of the Stovers, and also designed the Capitol Theater (1922) on Wall Street that Stover purchased from Dennis Carmody.

Background
Stover worked at the Bend Company mill and was a bank teller at Independent First National Bank. He served in World War I including at Château-Thierry in France, and was a theater owner and clothing retailer. Known as a youth booster, he organized the first annual Bend Water Pageant and was elected a State Representative, serving in the 1951-195 legislature under governors Douglas McKay and Paul Patterson. He was a member of numerous organizations. Bend's Stover Park is named after him.

Stover's wife, Ruth Cushing, was born in Spokane, Washington to pioneer parents. She was the first four-year graduate to receive a diploma at Portland's Jefferson High School in 1913, attended Eastern Washington Normal School in Cheney, and taught in Riparia, Washington and Salem, Oregon.

References

Further reading
 Harriet Langmas, conversations with Ruth Stover, c. 1986
Pioneer Spirits of Bend Gribskov 1980
Bend in Central Oregon Raymond R. Hatton, 1978
A History of Deschutes County in Oregon Deschuttes County HIstorical Society, 1988
Little Known Tales from Oregon History, Vol. II, Cascades East, Sun Publishing Company, 1991

Houses completed in 1924
Houses on the National Register of Historic Places in Bend, Oregon
1924 establishments in Oregon